Arthur Godart (born 21 July 1889, date of death unknown) was a French racing cyclist. He rode in the 1920 Tour de France.

References

1889 births
Year of death missing
French male cyclists
Place of birth missing